Papadatos is a Greek surname. Notable people with the surname include:

Alecos Papadatos (born 1959), Greek comic book writer and illustrator
Dimitrios Papadatos (born 1991), Australian golfer

Greek-language surnames
Surnames